Nea Erythraia is a suburb in the northeastern part of the Athens agglomeration, Greece. Since the 2011 local government reform it is part of the municipality Kifissia, of which it is a municipal unit.

Geography

Nea Erythraia is situated at the western end of the forested Penteli mountain range. The municipal unit has an area of 4.831 km2. The small river Kifisos forms the northwestern border of the municipal unit. Nea Erythraia is situated 14 km northeast of Athens city centre. The built-up area of Nea Erythraia is continuous with that of the neighbouring suburb Kifisia. Motorway 1, Greek National Road 1 and Greek National Road 83 pass through the town.

For many years, Nea Erythraia was home to the senior division of Campion, one of Greece's oldest English-language schools.

On September 14, 2004, the paralympic flame arrived in Nea Erythraia as it travelled from Marathon.

Historical population

References

External links
City of Nea Erythraia official website 
http://emidius.mi.ingv.it/GNDT/T19990907/Athens990907_ismes/ate_html/09.html 
Nea Erythraia Photos

Populated places in North Athens (regional unit)